The 2003 European Curling Championships were held in Courmayeur, Italy December 5–13.

Men's

A tournament

Final round robin standings

Playoffs

Bronze-medal game
December 13th, 14:00

Gold-medal game
December 13th, 14:00

Medals

Women's

A tournament

Final round robin standings

Playoffs

Semifinals
December 12th, 11:30

Bronze-medal game
December 13th, 10:00

Gold-medal game
December 13th, 10:00

Medals

References
Men: 
Women: 

European Curling Championships
Curling Championships
European Curling Championships
International curling competitions hosted by Italy
2003 in European sport